Doctor Richter is a Russian television medical drama that was aired on the Russia-1 network from 2017 to 2019. The series' main character is Dr. Andrei Richter (Alexey Serebryakov), a pain medication-dependent, unconventional, misanthropic medical genius who leads a team of diagnosticians at the 100th Clinic Hospital in Moscow. The series serves as a direct and authorised remake of House for Russian television, after VGTRK purchased the broadcast rights from NBCUniversal.

Also, in 2010, a Russian TV series titled Doctor Tyrsa, which was loosely modelled on House, was aired on Channel One Russia, but lasted only one season.

Production
The production began in April 2016.

Actor Alexey Serebryakov was cast as the lead role in the series. Shooting began in April, while the first season was released in late 2017.

On a project commissioned by the media holding VGTRK and channel “Russia-1” works produced by Alexander Rodnyansky from “Non-stop production”.

The general director of Russia 1, Anton Zlatopolsky, said that a remake of such a popular series is a serious challenge for the channel. “As a rule, neither the professionalism of the producers, nor famous actors, nor invested funds guarantee absolute success when it comes to local remakes. There is always a couple of secret components that make the show outstanding, and we know how to make them work,” said Zlatopolsky.

References

External links
House Set for Russian Remake with Aleksei Serebryakov in Hugh Laurie Role
Leviathan Star to Play Lead in Russian Remake of House

House (TV series)
Russia-1 original programming
Russian medical television series
2017 Russian television series debuts
2019 Russian television series endings
2010s Russian television series
Russian drama television series
Russian television series based on American television series
Russian-language television shows
Serial drama television series
Television shows set in Russia
Television shows set in Moscow